Andrew Talansky (born November 23, 1988) is an American triathlete. Born in Manhattan, New York City, New York, Talansky was raised in Key Biscayne, Florida, an island near Miami, Florida. He resides in Girona, Catalonia, Spain, and in Napa, California.

Biography

Talansky competed in cross-country running at high school in Florida before taking up competitive cycling at age 17. After success in local amateur races, he moved to Lees–McRae College in Banner Elk, North Carolina, winning the collegiate national championship race in his freshman year. He left college after one year to join the  team in Italy in 2009, but found the conditions unsatisfactory and returned to the US that spring. He raced in the US in 2009 without team support. After a strong ride at the Tour of the Gila race, he joined Garmin for the 2010 season, moving up to the professional team for 2011, where he made the top ten at the 2011 Tour de Romandie.

In 2012, Talansky scored his first professional victory in Europe at the Tour de l'Ain, and again rode the Tour de Romandie. This time he finished second overall behind Bradley Wiggins, having finished second to Wiggins on the final stage, a  individual time trial. Later in the season he was named Garmin's lead rider for the Vuelta a España, finishing seventh in the general classification. In 2013, he came second in Paris–Nice, having led the race for two days, and was selected for the Tour de France for the first time, again making the top ten overall.

He won the 2014 Critérium du Dauphiné, joining a high-quality breakaway group on the final stage to overcome a 39-second deficit to overnight race leader Alberto Contador. He retired from the 2014 Tour de France after a very uncomfortable day on his bike, due to multiple crashes. The broom wagon was following him at the end of the stage. He returned to the Tour de France in 2015, finishing eleventh overall. The following year he once again contested the Tour de Romandie, but rode in support of Rigoberto Urán and Pierre Rolland. Later in the season, he took fifth-place overall finishes at the Tour de Suisse and the Vuelta a España.

In September 2017 Talansky announced his retirement from competition via an Instagram post. However, the following month he indicated that he had "un-retired" and would take up competing in triathlon.

Major results

2008
 1st  Road race, National Collegiate Road Championships
2010
 1st  Time trial, National Under-23 Road Championships
 1st Stage 2 Tour des Pays de Savoie
 2nd Overall Tour de l'Avenir
 3rd Overall Ronde de l'Isard
 6th Overall Tour of the Gila
 10th Overall Giro della Valle d'Aosta
2011
 4th Overall Tour Méditerranéen
 9th Overall Tour de Romandie
1st  Young rider classification
2012
 1st  Overall Tour de l'Ain
1st  Points classification
1st Stage 4
 2nd Overall Tour de Romandie
1st  Young rider classification
 7th Overall Vuelta a España
 8th Overall Volta ao Algarve
2013
 2nd Overall Paris–Nice
1st  Young rider classification
1st Stage 3
 6th Overall Critérium International
 10th Overall Tour de France
2014
 1st  Overall Critérium du Dauphiné
 7th Overall Volta a Catalunya
2015
 1st  Time trial, National Road Championships
 10th Overall Critérium du Dauphiné
2016
 3rd Overall Tour of Utah
1st Stage 6
 4th Overall Tour of California
 5th Overall Vuelta a España
 5th Overall Tour de Suisse
2017
 3rd Overall Tour of California
1st Stage 5

Grand Tour general classification results timeline

References

External links

 
 
 
 
 
 
 Andrew Talansky at Cycling Base
 Andrew Talansky at Cannondale-Garmin

American male cyclists
1988 births
Living people
Sportspeople from Manhattan
Cyclists from New York (state)